Skeleton is one of the Olympic sport disciplines contested at the Winter Olympic Games. It was introduced at the 1928 Winter Olympics in St. Moritz – the birthplace of skeleton – in the form of a men's event contested over four runs. Dropped from the 1932 and 1936 Winter Olympics program, skeleton returned in 1948, when St. Moritz hosted again the Winter Olympics, but was discarded from the following Games in Oslo. After 54 years of absence from the Olympic program, skeleton was reinstated as an official medal sport at the 2002 Winter Olympics in Salt Lake City, featuring individual events for men and women.

In 1928, the first Olympic skeleton event was won by American sledder Jennison Heaton, who also won a silver medal in the bobsleigh's five-man event. His younger brother, John Heaton, was runner-up, spending an additional second to complete all three runs (the fourth was cancelled). He repeated this result 20 years later, placing behind Nino Bibbia of Italy, who won his country's first Winter Olympic gold medal.

In 2002, American sledder Jimmy Shea – grandson of Jack Shea, two-time Olympic speed skating champion at the 1932 Lake Placid Games – secured the gold medal by 0.05 seconds, becoming the first Olympic skeleton champion in 54 years. On the same day, another American, Tristan Gale, won the first-ever women's event in the discipline. In the 2006 Winter Olympics men's event, 39-year-old Canadian Duff Gibson beat countryman and world champion Jeff Pain to become the oldest individual gold medalist at the Winter Games. Switzerland's Gregor Stähli won the bronze medal for the second time, beating the third Canadian sledder, Paul Boehm, by 0.26 seconds and thus preventing a medal sweep for Canada. Four years later, Jon Montgomery secured a back-to-back victory for Canada in the men's event, while Amy Williams's win in the women's event gave Great Britain its only medal at the 2010 Winter Olympics, as well as its first individual gold medalist since 1980, and first individual female gold medalist since 1952. This victory was emulated four years later in Sochi by another British athlete, Lizzy Yarnold, who secured her country's second consecutive Olympic skeleton gold medal. 
The following day, Aleksandr Tretyakov – who had won Russia's first Olympic skeleton medal in Vancouver – beat the 2010 Olympic silver medalist Martins Dukurs of Latvia in the men's event to secure his first Olympic title.

Having won two medals in an equal number of participations, Lizzy Yarnold, John Heaton, Gregor Stähli, Martins Dukurs and Aleksandr Tretyakov are the joint medal leaders in Olympic skeleton, Lizzy Yarnold leading however due to winning two gold medals at two operate games, being the only athlete in the men's and women's event to defend their title. As of 2018, Great Britain are the most successful National Olympic Committee (NOC) in Olympic skeleton ranked by number of medals, having won nine medals (three golds, one silver and five bronze) and was the only NOC to have collected a medal every Games that skeleton has featured at the Winter Olympics until 2022; they have featured particularly strongly in the women's event, with 3 of the 5 gold medalists, and 6 of the 15 total medalists. The United States comes next with eight medals (three golds, four silver and one bronze). By the alternative measure of number of golds, then silvers, then bronzes, the US is the most successful, with Great Britain in second place.

Men

Women

Statistics

Multiple medalists

Medals per year

See also
IBSF World Championships (bobsleigh and skeleton)
List of Skeleton World Cup champions

References
Medalists

Citations

Skeleton
Skeleton at the Winter Olympics